Pyknosis, or karyopyknosis, is the irreversible condensation of chromatin in the nucleus of a cell undergoing necrosis or apoptosis. It is followed by karyorrhexis, or fragmentation of the nucleus.
Pyknosis (from Ancient Greek  meaning "thick, closed or condensed") is also observed in the maturation of erythrocytes (a red blood cell) and the neutrophil (a type of white blood cell). The maturing metarubricyte (a stage in RBC maturation) will condense its nucleus before expelling it to become a reticulocyte. The maturing neutrophil will condense its nucleus into several connected lobes that stay in the cell until the end of its cell life.

Pyknotic nuclei are often found in the zona reticularis of the adrenal gland. They are also found in the keratinocytes of the outermost layer in parakeratinised epithelium.

Another use of the word pyknotic, introduced in mathematics in 2019, is for pyknotic objects, which are hypersheaves on the site of compacta; this use is unrelated to cell biology or nuclei.

See also 
Apoptosis
Karyolysis

References 

Cellular processes
Programmed cell death
Cellular senescence